Georgios Masouras (born 1 January 1994) is a Greek professional footballer who plays as a winger for Super League club Olympiacos and the Greece national team.

Club career
Masouras started his professional career in Ilisiakos and after he moved to Athenian club Panionios. On 27 April 2016, at the end of the 2015–16 season they reached to an agreement on a new contract with the club. The 22 year old midfielder had an excellent year and Panionios is eager to expedite the procedures for the renewal of his contract which expires on summer 2017. Finally, the two sides reached an agreement for another two years, until the summer of 2019, for an undisclosed fee.

He started the 2018–19 season as the undisputed leader of the club's offense.

Olympiacos
Masouras joined Olympiacos on 3 January 2019. He scored his first goal in a 4–0 win at home to AEL on 30 January, and scored three more goals in the 2018–19 Superleague season.

On 6 October 2019, he scored his first goal of the 2019–20 Superleague season, in a 2–1 away win against Aris. On 15 December 2019, Masouras scored a brace, converting two right-wing crosses from Hillal Soudani in a hammering 5–0 win against Asteras Tripolis at the Theodoros Kolokotronis Stadium.
On 18 December 2019, Masouras scored a brace by opening the scoring in the ninth minute as he cleverly turned Konstantinos Kostas Tsimikas’ cross into the net. The 25-year-old then registered his second goal just two minutes later, successfully connecting with Hillal Soudani’s pass to beat the goalkeeper with ease in a 4–1 home win game against AEL. On 1 March 2020, Masouras headed home from a precise Mathieu Valbuena’s cross on the hour mark, in a 2–0 home win game against Panetolikos. On 24 June 2020, Masouras headed the ball beyond Alexandros Paschalakis, with the PAOK goalkeeper just unable to get a hand on it, opening the score in a 2–0 home win Greek Cup game helping his club to reach the 2019–20 Greek Cup final.

On 18 September 2020, in the 2020–21 Super League Greece opener game, the entry of Masouras in the beginning of the second half, scorer of two goals, changed the image of the match and Olympiacos started the championship with a 3–0 home win against Asteras Tripolis. On 8 November 2020, he scored with a wonderful kick after an assist from Kostas Fortounis sealing a 2–0 away win against OFI. On 12 May 2021, Masouras scored in the first half sealing a 1-0 home win game against rivals PAOK. The game was especially important for Pedro Martins' team, as with this game, Olympiakos win its 46th championship. On 16 May 2021, Masouras scored a brace in a glorious 4-1 away win in the derby against Panathinaikos. It was the biggest away victory of Olympiacos against Panathinaikos in the Super League Greece since 1959-60 season. Masouras became the first player to score two goals so quickly (7', 12 ') in a derby against Panathinaikos. The previous record was from Rafik Djebbour (22', 34'), on December 9, 2012.  It was his best season, so far in his career (15 goals, 6 assists).

On 30 September 2021, in a UEFA Europa League group stage,  Giorgos Masouras made the difference by scoring twice (63 ′, 68 ′), while he also gave an assist to Tiquinho's goal, to help his team seal an emphatic 3–0 away win against Fenerbahçe. He was voted man of the match for his performance, as well as Player of the week. On 9 February 2022, Masouras with a goal at the last minute of the game and with another in extra time sealed the qualification in the semifinals of the 2021–22 Greek Football Cup against Panetolikos F.C. He was voted man of the match for his performance. On 2 March 2022, he scored a brace in three minutes (54' , 57') in a 5-1 home win game against Asteras Tripoli F.C.

International career
On 9 November 2018, new Greece coach Angelos Anastasiadis called up Masouras for the matches against Finland and Estonia for UEFA Nations League. "All players dream of someday representing their country and I am happy for this opportunity. It is a child's dream for me", Masouras said.
On 18 November 2018, he made his debut in a 1–0 home loss game against Estonia.

Career statistics

Club

International
Scores and results list Greece's goal tally first.

Honours

Club
Olympiacos
Super League Greece: 2019–20, 2020–21, 2021–22
Greek Cup: 2019–20 ; runner-up: 2020–21

Individual
Super League Greece Player of the Month: September 2020
Super League Greece Greek Player of the Year: 2020–21, 2021–22
Super League Greece–Fantasy League Award Winger of the Year: 2020–21
Super League Greece Team of the Year: 2018–19, 2020–21, 2021–22

References

External links
 
 
 

1994 births
Living people
Greek footballers
Footballers from Amfilochia
Ilisiakos F.C. players
Gamma Ethniki players
Super League Greece players
Panionios F.C. players
Olympiacos F.C. players
Greece under-21 international footballers
Greece international footballers
Association football midfielders